"Nu så kommer julen, nu är julen här", or titled Julvisa, is originally a poem published by Zacharias Topelius in 1857. It has been set to music several times, originally by Richard Norén in 1875.

Compositions 
 Richard Norén (1847-1922), published 1875.
 Alice Tegnér, published 1895 in Sjung med oss, Mamma!, issue 3.
 Gustaf Stolpe, unknown year.
 Cid Smedberg, unknown year (circa 1900).
 Jean Sibelius, composed 1913.
 Ellen Heijkorn, published 1920.
N. Herman, unknown, year unknown.

The song is in the film "Sagan om Karl-Bertil Jonssons julafton", using the Ellen Heijkorn tune.

Recordings
An early recording was done by Inga Berentz in Stockholm in September 1909.

References

Swedish Christmas songs
Finnish songs
Swedish-language songs
1857 songs